The Northern Ireland Assembly elected in November 2003 never met as such: Northern Ireland's devolved government and representative institutions had been suspended with the re-introduction of direct rule by the United Kingdom government on 14 October 2002. However, the persons (Members of the Legislative Assembly, MLAs) elected to the Assembly at the 2003 assembly election were called together in a non-legislative capacity, initially under the Northern Ireland Act 2006 and then under the St Andrews Agreement. These bodies failed to form a government before the 2007 election.

The following is a list of the members of that second Assembly, including members co-opted after the election to replace those who had resigned or died, and changes in party affiliation.

Party strengths

Notes

Graphical representation

MLAs by party
This is a list of MLAs elected to the Northern Ireland Assembly in the 2003 Northern Ireland Assembly election, sorted by party.

† Co-opted to replace an elected MLA

‡ Changed affiliation during the term

MLAs by constituency
The list is given in alphabetical order by constituency.

† Co-opted to replace an elected MLA
‡ Changed affiliation during the term

Changes since the election

† Co-options

‡ Changes in affiliation

See also 
 Members of the Northern Ireland Assembly elected in 1998
 Members of the Northern Ireland Forum elected in 1996
 Northern Ireland MPs
 2007 Northern Ireland Assembly election

Notes

References 

 
Lists of members of the Northern Ireland Assembly
2003 in Northern Ireland